Orientierungslaufclub des Fürstentums Liechtenstein (OL FL)  is the national orienteering club of Liechtenstein.  It is a  full Member of the International Orienteering Federation.

References 

Sport in Liechtenstein
Liechtenstein